MI-4, MI4, MI 4, or variant may refer to:

 MI4, British Military Intelligence Section 4
 Mil Mi-4
 Michigan's 4th congressional district
 M-4 (Michigan highway)
 Mission: Impossible – Ghost Protocol, a 2011 action film starring Tom Cruise
 Xiaomi Mi 4, an Android smartphone produced by Xiaomi Tech
 Escape from Monkey Island (also known as Monkey Island 4), videogame